The Church of the Good Shepherd & The St. Marylebone Church Institute & Club is a grade II listed building in Paddington Street in the City of Westminster.

References

External links 

Grade II listed buildings in the City of Westminster
Buildings and structures in Marylebone